George Walter Freese (September 12, 1926 – July 27, 2014) was a third baseman in Major League Baseball. He played for the Detroit Tigers in 1953, Pittsburgh Pirates in 1955 and Chicago Cubs in 1961.  Freese attended West Virginia University, where he played college baseball for the Mountaineers in 1947. While at West Virginia he was a member of Phi Sigma Kappa fraternity.

He was later a member of the Cubs coaching staff from 1964–1965 and a minor league manager for the Bakersfield Dodgers in 1973-1974.

The older brother of MLB third baseman Gene Freese, George Freese lived in Portland, Oregon, where he played three years of minor league baseball for the Portland Beavers. He was inducted into the Oregon Sports Hall of Fame in 2008.

References

Obituary

External links

Major League Baseball third basemen
Detroit Tigers players
Pittsburgh Pirates players
Chicago Cubs players
Johnstown Johnnies players
Lancaster Red Roses players
Newport News Dodgers players
Elmira Pioneers players
Fort Worth Cats players
Pueblo Dodgers players
Mobile Bears players
Springfield Cubs players
New Orleans Pelicans (baseball) players
Hollywood Stars players
Los Angeles Angels (minor league) players
Portland Beavers players
San Diego Padres (minor league) players
Houston Buffs players
St. Cloud Rox players
Wenatchee Chiefs players
Treasure Valley Cubs players
Baseball players from West Virginia
Baseball players from Portland, Oregon
Minor league baseball managers
West Virginia Mountaineers baseball players
1926 births
2014 deaths
Chicago Cubs coaches
Chicago Cubs scouts